Provincial Trunk Highway 1 (PTH 1) is Manitoba's section of the Trans-Canada Highway. It is a heavily used, 4-lane divided highway, with the exception of a short 18 km section in the southeastern corner of the province. It is the main link between southern Manitoba's largest cities, and also serves as the province's main transportation link to the neighbouring provinces of Saskatchewan (to the west) and Ontario (to the east). The highway is the only major east-west divided highway in Manitoba, and carries a large majority of east-west traffic within and through the province. It has full freeway status sections at Portage la Prairie and Winnipeg.

PTH 1 is a very important part of the national highway system. It is the only road that links the province of Manitoba (and thus the entirety of Western Canada) with the province of Ontario, making it a major section of Canada's primary commercial and leisure route for all traffic travelling between Canada's largest cities, from Toronto and Montreal in the east to Calgary and Vancouver in the west.

Routing 

The highway is routed from west to east across the province of Manitoba. It begins at the western provincial boundary with Saskatchewan, connecting with Saskatchewan's Highway 1 to become Manitoba Trans-Canada 1. The highway is designated as T-C 1 throughout Manitoba until it reaches the eastern provincial boundary with Ontario, where it continues as the main route to Kenora, Ontario and the rest of Eastern Canada as Highway 17.

The entire length of the Trans-Canada Highway in the province of Manitoba is a 4-lane divided highway, with the exception of the Winnipeg city route and an 18 kilometre section in eastern Manitoba between the town of Falcon Lake and the Manitoba-Ontario provincial boundary which is a two-lane highway.

PTH 1 has full expressway status on the routes around Winnipeg on the Perimeter Highway, and around Portage la Prairie. Plans do exist to bring the entire length of PTH 1 (except the Winnipeg city route) to full expressway status in the future (mentioned at the list of Manitoba expressways). Currently, exit numbers only exist at three interchanges, and only small sections of PTH 1 and the Perimeter Highway have freeway status.

In the Winnipeg metro area, the Trans-Canada Highway has two official routes. The main route passes directly through the city of Winnipeg on city streets, entering the city from the west and continuing along Portage Avenue, Broadway, Main Street, Queen Elizabeth Way, St. Mary's Road, St. Anne's Road, and Fermor Avenue where it re-joins the Perimeter Highway (T-C 100) and continues east on TC 1.
An alternate routing exits the main T-C 1 route on the western edge of Winnipeg onto the Perimeter Highway (T-C 100), which by-passes the city completely. The Perimeter Highway is a ring road which encircles Winnipeg and is frequently used by commuters and through traffic on the Trans Canada Highway wishing to avoid congested city streets.

History 

The first Provincial Trunk Highways in Manitoba were numbered in 1926.  The original Highway 1 was one of nine highways fanning out from Winnipeg, but was different in that it fanned out from the west and the east.  Highway 1 was routed via many already-existing highways and provincial secondary roads.  (From west to east), these are:
Highway 1A into and out of Brandon
Provincial Road 351 into and out of Carberry
Highway 1A through Portage la Prairie
Highway 26 from Portage la Prairie to Headingley
Highway 9 from downtown Winnipeg to Lockport
Highway 44 from Lockport to Whiteshell Provincial Park

In 1949, Highway 1 had been rerouted on new construction northeast of Griswold, with the part of old route from Highway 21 to Highway 28 (as well as Highway 28 itself) becoming part of Highway 21, and the section from Highway 21 eastward being removed from the system, but later becoming PR 455. By the early 1950s, Highway 1 had become an important east-west route in all of the western provinces. Most of the provincial highways that Highway 1 originally traversed on were re-numbered and designated as Highway 4 between 1958 and 1968, and the #1 was relocated to its present route. In 1962, the Trans-Canada Highway in Manitoba was fully completed, and Highway 1 across all of the western provinces was incorporated as part of the Trans-Canada Highway.

In 1955, most intra-city traffic in the Winnipeg area was diverted onto the (then) newly built Perimeter Highway.  Later that year, the Perimeter Highway's southern (PTH 100) section was merged with the Trans-Canada Highway system, due to the amount of traffic using it to bypass the city.  That section of the highway was highly used, and still is today.

Recent developments 

On October 6, 2006 the Trans-Canada Highway Portage la Prairie by-pass was closed due to a structural defect found in the bridge over the CN Rail Line. On October 31, 2007, a $19 million project to rebuild the bridge was completed, and the by-pass was fully re-opened to traffic.

On April 9, 2008, the Government of Manitoba announced that construction of a new interchange would begin in the summer of 2008 at the intersection of Highway 16 (the Yellowhead Highway) and the Trans Canada Highway mainline route, located a short distance west of Portage la Prairie.  As of 2020, the option for a new interchange was replaced by a study to instead construct a roundabout at this intersection

Speed limits

On February 27, 2008 the Manitoba Highway Traffic Board approved a request by the Government of Manitoba to raise the speed limit on the Trans Canada Highway in Manitoba to 110 km/h along the section between the Saskatchewan-Manitoba provincial boundary and Winnipeg. The speed limit was officially raised on July 1, 2009, though it was only raised on one portion of the highway between the Saskatchewan provincial boundary to Virden.  On June 2, 2015, the speed limit between Virden and Headingley increased to 110 km/h, except at Brandon, Carberry, Portage la Prairie, and Elie, where speed is reduced due to major intersections at those locations.  The portion of the highway from Winnipeg to the Ontario provincial boundary remains at 100 km/h.

Saskatchewan provincial boundary to Headingley- 110 km/h (70 mph)

Virden- 80 km/h (50 mph)

Brandon- 80 km/h (50 mph)

Carberry- 100 km/h (60 mph)

Portage la Prairie (Freeway)- 100 km/h (60 mph)

Elie- 80 km/h (50 mph)

Headingley-70 km/h (45 mph)

Winnipeg bypass (Perimeter Hwy. PTH #100) - 100 km/h (60 mph)

Winnipeg city route

Portage Ave.  - 60 km/h (35 mph) (50 km/h (30 mph) in downtown)

Broadway  - 50 km/h (30 mph)

Queen Elizabeth Way. (S. Main Street)  - 60 km/h (35 mph)

St. Mary's Rd.  - 60 km/h (35 mph)

St. Anne's Rd.  - 60 km/h (35 mph)

Fermor Ave. (To Autumnwood Dr./Lakewood Blvd.)  - 70 km/h (45 mph)

Fermor Ave. (To Lagimodiere Blvd.)  80 km/h (50 mph)

Fermor Ave. (To Perimeter Hwy.)  - 90 km/h (55 mph)

Eastern Manitoba- 100 km/h (60 mph)

All at-grade intersections with traffic lights -80 km/h (50 mph)

Major intersections

See also

References

External links 
Official Name and Location - Declaration of Provincial Trunk Highways Regulation - The Highways and Transportation Act - Provincial Government of Manitoba
Official Highway Map - Published and maintained by the Department of Infrastructure - Provincial Government of Manitoba (see Legend and Maps#1,2 & 3)
Google Maps Search - Provincial Trunk Highway 1

001
Manitoba 001
Manitoba 001
Yellowhead Highway